Hollywood Boulevard is the name of themed "lands" in various theme parks around the world. The lands, which exist in Disney's Hollywood Studios, at the Walt Disney World Resort in Bay Lake, Florida, near Orlando, as well Parque Warner Madrid in San Martín de la Vega, near Madrid, Spain, draw inspiration from real historic landmark in Hollywood, California.

In both parks the "land" serves as the main park entrance and operates in the same vein as Main Street, U.S.A. at Magic Kingdom. The front part of Hollywood Boulevard at Disney's Hollywood Studios, the closest near the entrance gate, features a full-scale reproduction of the entrance of Crossroads of the World, only with the slight alteration, Disney's features Mickey Mouse on top. While the front of Hollywood Boulevard at Warner Bros.'s Parque Warner Madrid features a large Art Deco fountain reminiscent of the style that was popular during the Golden Age of Hollywood. Each "land" of Parque Warner utilizes different architectural types to create distinct visual environments, with Art Deco being the main influence of Hollywood Boulevard.

Other theme parks such as those owned by Universal Parks & Resorts feature Hollywood inspired sections of their parks, but they are not explicitly named Hollywood Boulevard.

Disney's Hollywood Studios

Hollywood Boulevard serves as just a mere section of a theme park inspired by show business. Upon its opening in 1989, then CEO of Disney Michael Eisner proclaimed their third park would be "dedicated to Hollywood" and "[it would] welcome [guests] to a Hollywood that never was—and always will be." The park originally included an operating production studio, with active film and television production services, an animation facility branch, and a functioning backlot, which has since been removed.

The entrance-way features scaled down versions of historic Hollywood landmarks, such as the Pan Pacific Auditorium, the Crossroads of the World, and Chapman Plaza. The farthest end of Hollywood Boulevard, opposite the entrance, stands a full-scale replica of the Grauman's Chinese Theatre, although Disney couldn't get the rights to use the name "Grauman's", calling it merely the Chinese Theater.

Attractions and entertainment
 Citizens of Hollywood
 March of the First Order
 Mickey & Minnie's Runaway Railway
 Star Wars: A Galactic Spectacular

Former attractions and entertainment
 The Great Movie Ride
 Disney Stars and Motor Cars Parade

Restaurants and refreshments
 The Hollywood Brown Derby
 The Trolley Car Café (Sponsored by Starbucks)

Shops
 Adrian and Edith's Head to Toe
 Celebrities 5 & 10
 Cover Story
 The Darkroom
 Keystone Clothiers
 Mickey's of Hollywood
 Movieland Memorabilia
 Sid Cahuenga's One-of-a-Kind 
 Oscar's Super Service

Warner Bros. Movie World Germany
Hollywood Boulevard opened with Movie World Germany in 1996, and served the same purpose as the entrance way at Disney's Hollywood Studios, and Parque Warner Madrid. Guests would pass under the Movie World Grand Archway which marked the beginning of Hollywood Boulevard. The end of the street, closest to the exit, featured a massive Art Deco fountain called the Fountain of Fame, which has since been renamed.

Attractions and entertainment
 Roxy Theatre
 The Bermuda Triangle

Former attractions and entertainment
 Police Academy Stunt Show
 Movie Studio Tour
 Movie Magic
 Movie World On Parade
 Hollywood On Parade
 Character's On Parade

Restaurants and refreshments
 Warner Bros. Studios Cafeteria
 Ricks Café Américain

Shops
 Warner Bros. Department Store

Parque Warner Madrid

Inspired by the streets in Hollywood the Warner Brothers, Harry, Albert, Sam, and Jack would have walked down themselves. Hollywood Boulevard is designed to resemble the idealized 1920s star-studded streets of Los Angeles. The street features a Warner-ized version of the Hollywood Walk of Fame, instead of the names being in stars like they are traditionally, on Hollywood Boulevard at Parque Warner Madrid the names appear in the WB Shield. Unlike Disney's, Warner Bros.'s Hollywood Boulevard doesn't imitate actual buildings in Los Angeles rather draws on the aesthetics of the era and makes them their own.

The only building similar between both Hollywood Boulevard's are the Chinese Theater. Whereas Disney's is a full scale reproduction, it can easily be seen that Warner Brothers's is not, but instead is drawing on the aesthetics of the original. Another difference is instead of Parque Warner's Chinese theater being distinct at the end of the Boulevard, instead it is tucked away on the path much like the original in Los Angeles. The end of Hollywood Boulevard is dominated by the nearly 400-feet tall drop tower The Revenge of the Enigma.

Attractions and entertainment
 Chinese Theater 3D
 Welcome to Parque Warner

Restaurants and refreshments
 Beverly Hills Bakery
 Foster's Hollywood
 Hollywood Hot Dogs
 Starbucks
 Sunset Sweets
 Valentino's

Shops
 Parque Warner Department Store
 Looney Tunes Hollywood Collection

References

1989 establishments in Florida
2002 establishments in Spain
Disney's Hollywood Studios
Themed areas in Walt Disney Parks and Resorts
Themed areas in Warner Bros. Parks and Resorts